The Battle of Pesaro was a minor battle in the Neapolitan War that took place on 28 April 1815 in the town of Pesaro. 

The main Neapolitan army, commanded by their king, Joachim Murat, was retreating to their original headquarters in Ancona following a string a defeats in Northern Italy at the hands of the Germans. The Neapolitans were being pursued by an Austrian corps under the command of Adam Albert von Neipperg. Just like at the Battle of Cesenatico, a vastly outnumbered Austrian raiding party of hussars and jägers once again successfully attacked a Neapolitan garrison of 3,000 men during the night. The Austrians brought out 250 prisoners with only minor casualties whilst inflicting moderate casualties on the garrison, forcing them to flee during the night.

Citations

References

Further reading 
Capt. Batty, An Historical Sketch of the Campaign of 1815, London (1820)
Details of battle at Clash of Steel

External links 

Conflicts in 1815
Battles of the Neapolitan War
Battles involving Austria
Battles involving the Kingdom of Naples
1815 in Italy
1815 in the Austrian Empire
April 1815 events